Alona is a feminine given name. Notable people with the name include:

Israel 
In Hebrew, Alona is the feminine version of Alon.
 Alona Barkat (born 1969), Israeli businesswoman and football team owner
 Alona Frankel (born 1937), Polish-Israeli author and illustrator of children's books
 Alona Kimhi (born 1966), Israeli author and actress
Alona Koshevatskiy (born 1997), Israeli rhythmic  gymnast
 Alona Tal (born 1983), Israeli television actress

Other cultures 
 Alona Alegre (born 1948), Filipino actress 
 Alona Bondarenko (born 1984), Ukrainian tennis player

Fictional characters:
 Alona, a character in the Filipino television series Atlantika

 

Hebrew feminine given names
Ukrainian feminine given names